Chandrabose Suthaharan was a minority Sri Lankan Tamil editor of the Tamil magazine, Nilam, and he also wrote for other Tamil news media. He had earlier worked for Virakesari. He was shot and killed on 16 April 2007, in Thirunavatkulam in Vavuniya.

Background
His killing is part of series of killings, abductions and attacks on journalists in Sri Lanka. It was also seen as part of the intimidation of Tamil media.

Incident

He was shot inside his house by six gunmen who entered his house. His eight-year-old son stated that the killers spoke both Tamil and Sinhala. His home was located inside a government held area.

Government investigation
The International Press Institute has called in for an impartial government investigation.

See also
Sri Lankan civil war
Human Rights in Sri Lanka
Notable assassinations of the Sri Lankan Civil War

References

External links
Sri Lanka mission report
 Nine recommendations for improving media freedom in Sri Lanka – RSF
Media in Sri Lanka
Free Speech in Sri Lanka

Year of birth missing
2007 deaths
Deaths by firearm in Sri Lanka
Assassinated Sri Lankan journalists
Sri Lankan Tamil journalists
Sri Lankan Tamil editors
Assassinated Sri Lankan activists
People murdered in Sri Lanka